Amadeus Capital Partners is a venture capital firm that invests in European high-technology companies, founded by Anne Glover and Hermann Hauser in 1997.

It is a member of the British Private Equity and Venture Capital Association and is approved as an Enterprise Capital Fund.

It has invested in lastminute.com, Clearswift, Icera Seldon and Doctify.

References

Venture capital
Companies based in the London Borough of Camden